Ese-Khayya (Ehe Xaya) is an urban locality (an urban-type settlement) in Verkhoyansky District of the Sakha Republic, Russia, located  from Batagay, the administrative center of the district. As of the 2010 Census, its population was 239.

Geography
Ynnakh Mountain is a granite massif located a few miles to the southeast of Ese-Khayya. The Batagaika crater is also located nearby to the northeast.

History
Urban-type settlement status was granted to Ese-Khayya in 1940.

Administrative and municipal status
Within the framework of administrative divisions, the urban-type settlement of Ese-Khayya is incorporated within Verkhoyansky District as the Settlement of Ese-Khayya. As a municipal division, the Settlement of Ese-Khayya is incorporated within Verkhoyansky Municipal District as Ese-Khayya Urban Settlement.

References

Notes

Sources
Official website of the Sakha Republic. Registry of the Administrative-Territorial Divisions of the Sakha Republic. Verkhoyansky District. 

Urban-type settlements in the Sakha Republic
